Eevi Paasmäe (born 11 May 1952 in Narva) is an Estonian politician. She was a member of XIII Riigikogu.

References

Living people
1952 births
Estonian Centre Party politicians
Members of the Riigikogu, 2015–2019
Women members of the Riigikogu
University of Tartu alumni
Politicians from Narva
21st-century Estonian women politicians